Ilan Yeshua is the former chief executive officer (CEO) of Walla! Communications Channels Ltd. (from November 2006 to June 2019), an Israeli web portal, traded on the Tel Aviv Stock Exchange.

He is a former chief executive officer (CEO) of both Encyclopædia Britannica Inc. and Britannica.com Inc. On 16 May 2001, he replaced Don Yannias in the latter position.  When Britannica.com Inc. was spun off from Encyclopædia Britannica Inc. in 1999 to develop the Britannica's digital versions, Yannias switched to being CEO of Britannica.com Inc., leaving the CEO-ship of Encyclopædia Britannica Inc. vacant.  The two CEO-ships were re-united under Yeshua, who had been serving as CEO of Britannica Israel, Ltd., a wholly owned subsidiary of Britannica.com Inc.

Before his time with the Britannica, Yeshua was long associated with the Centre for Educational Technology (CET), an educational technology firm based in Tel Aviv that was partially acquired by Britannica.com Inc.  At CET, he worked his way up through several positions, including marketing manager, head of the medical division and developer of educational learning materials, and finally deputy general director.  He also served as chief executive officer for a CET subsidiary, the Centre for Educational Technology Holdings

Yeshua obtained a bachelor's degree with honors in medical science from Hebrew University and an Executive MBA (magna cum laude) from Tel-Aviv University .

On April 5, 2021, Yeshua gave testimony during Israeli Prime Minister Benjamin Netanyahu's corruption trial, claiming to the Tel Aviv District Court that overall Walla! owner Shaul Elovitch ordered him to remove stories which were unfavorable to Netanyahu from the Walla website. On April 12, 2021, Yeshua gave more testimony, this time before the Jerusalem District Court, where he described Netanyahu as the "big guy" at Walla! and that the Israeli Prime Minister persuaded Walla! to publish only edited parts of an interview he conducted with journalist Dov Gilhar so it would give him favor a week before the March 2021 Israeli election. According to Yeshua, "any negative item led to outburst" from Netanyahu.  Yeshua also revealed a text message which Shaul sent to him in February 2015. In the text message, Shaul stated that he was having problems all day with Netanyahu, who he identified as “the big one.” On 20 April 2021, Yeshua detailed multiple instances where Netanyahu was involved in setting editorial policy at Walla!, such as telling Elovitch to take down a story which appeared on Walla about a romantic relationship between Yair Netanyahu, one of Netanyahu's sons, and a non-Jewish Norwegian woman and requesting attacks on Naftali Bennett and his wife Gilat. During Yeshua's testimony, prosecutors also presented text messages from Elovitch in a WhatsApp group for senior Bezeq officials and recorded conversations between Shaul and Iris Elovitch as evidence to back up the testimony. Yeshua's testimony finished on 21 April, and the judges subsequently halted proceedings for a two-week period so as to enable Netanyahu's defense to make preparations to cross-examine Yeshua.

On May 4, 2021, during his first defense cross-examination, Yeshua implicated the Israeli Prime Minister for removing stories about "bereaved" families of Israeli Defense Force (IDF) soldiers who were killed in the 2014 Gaza War. Some of these families reported, including the family of deceased IDF soldier Hadar Goldin, also did not have the remains of their relatives returned. He also stated that the Prime Minister's wife Sara also had influence at Walla! and implicated Netanyahu associate Zeev Rubinstein as “their senior officer in the Byzantine Court" who would pass on the “crazy requests and angles of Sara Netanyahu.”

References

Press release announcing Yannias' replacement as CEO (19 May 2001)

Yeshua, Ilan